The Estonian Writers Union (Eesti Kirjanike Liit, abbreviated EKL), is a professional association of Estonian writers and literary critics.

History

The Estonian Writers Union was founded on 8 October 1922 under the name Eesti Kirjanike Liit at the 3rd Congress of Estonian writers held at the Tallinn Town Hall. One of its founding members was the poet Anna Haava. On 27 April 1923, the association began the publication of the monthly magazine Looming ("Creation"), which is one of the most important literary magazines in Estonia. In 1927 the association expanded to Tartu with the opening of a branch there.

With the Soviet occupation of Estonia, the Estonian Writers Union was dissolved on 19 October 1940. The occupation authorities launched the Estonian Soviet Writers Union (Eesti Nõukogude Kirjanike Liit), on 8th or 9 October 1943 in Moscow. From 1958 it was called Writers Union of the Estonian SSR (Eesti NSV Kirjanike Liit) and was active until the end of the Soviet Union.

During the German occupation of Estonia during World War II from 1941 to 1944, the original Estonian writers' association unofficially continued its work. In 1945, the International Estonian Writers Union (Välismaine Eesti Kirjanike Liit) was founded in Stockholm as the organization of exiled Estonian writers as a counter organization to the Soviet Estonia Writers Union.

With the restoration of Estonian independence came the restoration of free expression and press freedom in Estonia, the association in Estonia was renamed Estonian Writers Union in 1991. The International Association merged with the Estonian Writers Union in October 2000.

Currently, the Estonian Writers Union has 302 members (as of July 2007). Its headquarters is located in the Old Town of Tallinn and has a branch in Tartu. Estonian Writers Association also has a summer house in Käsmu on the Baltic Sea, which is regularly made available for domestic and foreign writers.

Chairmen

Estonian Writers Union
1922–1923 Friedebert Tuglas 
1923–1924 Karl Rumor
1924–1925 Eduard Hubel 
1925–1927 Friedebert Tuglas 
1927–1929 Henrik Visnapuu 
1929–1930 Friedebert Tuglas 
1930–1936 Eduard Hubel 
1937–1939 Friedebert Tuglas 
1939–1940 August Jakobson 
1941–1943 Albert Kivikas 
1943–1944 Gustav Suits

Estonian Writers Union Abroad 
1945–1982 August Mälk 
1982–1999 Kalju Lepik 
1999–2000 Enn Nõu

Soviet Estonia Writers Union/Writers Union of the Estonian SSR
1943–1944 Johannes Vares-Barbarus 
1944–1946 August Jakobson 
1946–1950 Johannes Semper 
1950–1954 August Jakobson 
1954–1971 Juhan Smuul 
1971–1976 Vladimir Beekman 
1976–1983 Paul Kuusberg 
1983–1991 Vladimir Beekman

Estonian Writers Union
1991–1995 Vladimir Beekman 
1995–2004 Mati Sirkel 
2004–2007 Jan Kaus 
2007–2016 Karl Martin Sinijärv
Since 2016 Tiit Aleksejev

Literature

Ülo Tuulik (eds): Eesti Kirjanikkude Liit 75, Tallinn 1997 
Katrin Raid: Loomise lugu. Eesti aeg. Eesti Kirjanikkude Liit 1922–1940. Tallinn 2002

References

External links
 

Estonian literature
Arts in Estonia
Writers' organizations by country
Organizations established in 1922
1922 establishments in Estonia